Catalina Castaño Álvarez (born 7 July 1979) is a retired Colombian professional tennis player. Her highest singles ranking of 35 she achieved in 2006.

In her career, she won ten titles on the ITF Circuit, six in singles, as well as one doubles title on tournaments of the WTA Tour and the WTA 125K series, respectively.

Castaño defeated top-20 players such as Nicole Vaidišová, Anna-Lena Grönefeld, Patty Schnyder, Paola Suárez, Li Na and Lucie Šafářová. She was coached by Peruvian-born British citizen Pablo Giacopelli since 2004.

Career summary

1999–2004
In 1999 she won her first ITF title in Santiago. The following year she won two ITF titles in Midlothian and Cali. In 2001, she reached the quarterfinals in her home tournament of Bogotá, Colombia (Tier III). In 2002, Castaño advanced the semifinals in Bogotá. She reached four ITF finals, winning two of them - in Gorizia and Campobasso. She won 39 matches in the year and lost 18. In 2004, she reached the quarterfinals in Bogotá for the third time. She also has the distinction of being the last player to be defeated by Martina Navratilova at Wimbledon in the ladies singles, losing the match 0–6, 1–6. She won her sixth ITF title in Orbetello.

2005
In April, she won five matches in Miami (Tier I) including back-to-back wins over world No. 19, Paola Suárez, and world No. 13, Patty Schnyder, before falling to world No. 9, Venus Williams, in three sets in the round of 16. In May, she won four matches in Rome (Tier I) before losing to world No. 10, Vera Zvonareva, in the round of 16. In August, she reached her first ever WTA Tour final in Budapest. She lost to the top seed Anna Smashnova in the final, in straight sets. In October, she reached the semifinals in Seoul (Tier IV) but lost to the eventual champion Nicole Vaidišová.

2006
She commenced January with a semifinal showing in Canberra (Tier IV) and passed the first round of the Australian Open for the first time. In Charleston in mid-April, Catalina reached her first Tier I quarterfinal, after defeating Ashley Harkleroad, Nicole Vaidišová and Marion Bartoli. Her two-sets win over Vaidišová, who was ranked 14 at the time, was her best win of the year. The following week in Berlin, Catalina beat Anna-Lena Grönefeld, who was ranked 14 at the time. It was her second win over a top-15 player in as many weeks. In May, she reached the quarterfinals in Istanbul (Tier III) for the first time. She reached her highest ranking of No. 35 on July 16.

2007
Catalina commenced the new season with a solid start, recording two quarterfinal appearances at the Gold Coast and Hobart in January. At the Gold Coast, she defeated Li Na who was ranked 21 at the time.

2014
Castaño retired from professional tennis after a diagnosis of breast cancer.

WTA career finals

Singles: 1 (runner-up)

Doubles: 2 (1 title, 1 runner-up)

WTA 125K series finals

Singles: 1 (runner-up)

Doubles: 1 (1 title)

ITF Circuit finals

Singles: 13 (6–7)

Doubles: 7 (4–3)

Performance timelines

Singles

Doubles

Head-to-head record
Players who have been ranked world No. 1 are in boldface.
 Martina Navratilova - 0–1
 Nadia Petrova - 0–1
 Serena Williams - 0–1

External links
 
 
 

1979 births
Living people
People from Pereira, Colombia
Colombian female tennis players
Tennis players at the 2004 Summer Olympics
Olympic tennis players of Colombia
Tennis players at the 2011 Pan American Games
Pan American Games medalists in tennis
Pan American Games bronze medalists for Colombia
Medalists at the 2011 Pan American Games
20th-century Colombian women
21st-century Colombian women